Locked Down can refer to:

 Lockdown, an emergency protocol to prevents people or information from leaving an area
 "Locked Down" (song), a 2003 single by Turbonegro
 Locked Down, a 2010 American-Canadian crime film starring Vinnie Jones
 Locked Down (album), a 2012 album by Dr. John
 "Locked Down", a 2018 episode of One Day at a Time
 Locked Down (film), a 2021 American crime thriller set during the COVID-19 pandemic

See also
Lockdown (disambiguation)